The 2005 Davis Cup was the 94th edition of the most important tournament between nations in men's tennis. A total of 130 teams participated in the tournament. The final took place 2–4 December at the Sibamac Arena in Bratislava, Slovakia, with Croatia defeating Slovakia for their first title.

World Group

Draw

First round losers compete in play-off ties with Zonal Group I Qualifiers.

Final

World Group play-offs

Date: 23–25 September

  are promoted to the World Group in 2006.
  are relegated to Zonal Group I in 2006.

Americas Zone

Group I
Participating Teams
  — advanced to World Group Qualifying Round
  — advanced to World Group Qualifying Round
 
  — relegated to Group II in 2006

Group II
Participating Teams
  — relegated to Group III in 2006
  — promoted to Group I in 2006
 
  — relegated to Group III in 2006

Group III
Participating Teams
  — promoted to Group II in 2006
 
  — promoted to Group II in 2006
 
 
  — relegated to Group IV in 2006
 
  — relegated to Group IV in 2006

Group IV
Participating Teams
 
 
  — promoted to Group III in 2006
  — promoted to Group III in 2006

Asia/Oceania Zone

Group I
Participating Teams
 
 
  — advanced to World Group Qualifying Round
  — relegated to Group II in 2006
 
  — advanced to World Group Qualifying Round

Group II
Participating Teams
  — relegated to Group III in 2006
 
 
 
 
  Pacific Oceania
  — relegated to Group III in 2006
  — promoted to Group I in 2006

Group III
Participating Teams
 
  — promoted to Group II in 2006
  — promoted to Group II in 2006
  — relegated to Group IV in 2006
 
 
  — relegated to Group IV in 2006

Group IV
Participating Teams
  — promoted to Group III in 2006
 
 
 
 
 
  — promoted to Group III in 2006

Europe/Africa Zone

Group I
Participating Teams
  — advanced to World Group Qualifying Round
  — advanced to World Group Qualifying Round
  — advanced to World Group Qualifying Round
 
  — advanced to World Group Qualifying Round
 
 
 
  — relegated to Group II in 2006
  — relegated to Group II in 2006

Group II
Participating Teams
 
 
  — relegated to Group III in 2006
  — relegated to Group III in 2006
 
 
  — relegated to Group III in 2006
 
 
 
  — relegated to Group III in 2006
 
 
  — promoted to Group I in 2006
 
  — promoted to Group I in 2006

Group III

Venue I
Participating Teams
 
 
  — promoted to Group II in 2006
  — relegated to Group IV in 2006
 
  — promoted to Group II in 2006
  — relegated to Group IV in 2006

Venue II
Participating Teams
 
  — promoted to Group II in 2006
  — relegated to Group IV in 2006
  — promoted to Group II in 2006
 
  — relegated to Group IV in 2006

Group IV
Participating Teams
  — promoted to Group III in 2006
 
 
  — promoted to Group III in 2006
 
 
 
  — promoted to Group III in 2006
  — promoted to Group III in 2006

References

External links
Official website

 
Davis Cup
Davis Cups by year